Cheng Changjie is a Chinese paralympic archer. He won the silver medal at the Men's team recurve event at the 2008 Summer Paralympics in Beijing.

References

Living people
Chinese male archers
Paralympic archers of China
Paralympic silver medalists for China
Paralympic medalists in archery
Archers at the 2008 Summer Paralympics
Archers at the 2012 Summer Paralympics
Medalists at the 2008 Summer Paralympics
Medalists at the 2012 Summer Paralympics
Place of birth missing (living people)
Year of birth missing (living people)
21st-century Chinese people